Aglaia exstipulata is a species of plant in the family Meliaceae. It is found in Malaysia, Myanmar, Singapore, Thailand, and Vietnam.

References

exstipulata
Near threatened plants
Taxonomy articles created by Polbot